Carlos Alberto Silva Socarrás (born 29 April 1973) is a Colombian football manager and former player. He is the current manager of Unión Magdalena's youth categories.

Career
Silva was born in Santa Marta, and played for hometown side Unión Magdalena as a senior. After retiring, he returned to the club in 1996 as a manager of the youth categories.

Ahead of the 2008 season, Silva was named manager of Magdalena's first team in the Categoría Primera B. He left in August 2010, being subsequently replaced by Arturo Boyacá.

On 23 April 2011, Silva was again named at Unión Magdalena, in the place of Eduardo Retat. He remained in charge until the end of the 2012 season, as the club missed out promotion in the Finals.

Silva returned to Magdalena in 2014, but as a coordinator of the youth categories. On 21 August of the following year, he again replaced Retat at the helm of the first team.

Silva left Unión Magdalena again in September 2016, and moved abroad the following May after being presented as manager of Peruvian side Unión Comercio. In September, however, he was sacked.

On 17 September 2019, Silva returned to Unión Magdalena, with the club seriously threatened with relegation in the Categoría Primera A. Despite failing to avoid relegation, he remained in charge, and led the club back to the top tier in 2021.

On 12 April 2022, after the appointment of Claudio Rodríguez as manager of Magdalena, Silva was demoted to the role of youth manager.

References

External links

1973 births
Living people
People from Santa Marta
Colombian footballers
Unión Magdalena footballers
Colombian football managers
Categoría Primera A managers
Unión Magdalena managers
Peruvian Primera División managers
Colombian expatriate football managers
Colombian expatriate sportspeople in Peru
Expatriate football managers in Peru
Association footballers not categorized by position
Sportspeople from Magdalena Department
Unión Comercio managers